Ligusticopsis is a genus of flowering plants belonging to the family Apiaceae.

Its native range is Himalaya to China and Myanmar.

Species:

Ligusticopsis acaulis 
Ligusticopsis angelicifolia 
Ligusticopsis brachyloba 
Ligusticopsis capillacea 
Ligusticopsis daucoides 
Ligusticopsis deqenensis 
Ligusticopsis hispida 
Ligusticopsis involucrata 
Ligusticopsis likiangensis 
Ligusticopsis longiloba 
Ligusticopsis multivittata 
Ligusticopsis pseudodaucoides 
Ligusticopsis purpurascens 
Ligusticopsis rechingeriana 
Ligusticopsis scapiformis 
Ligusticopsis wallichiana 
Ligusticopsis xizangensis

References

Apioideae